Stig Mattsson is a Swedish ski-orienteering competitor. He won a silver medal in the long distance at the 1990 World Ski Orienteering Championships in Skellefteå, and a gold medal in the relay for Sweden, together with Jonas Engdahl, Bo Engdahl and Anders Björkman. He placed overall second in the World Cup in Ski Orienteering in the 1989 season.

References

Swedish orienteers
Male orienteers
Ski-orienteers
Year of birth missing (living people)
Living people